Myosauroides is an extinct genus of non-mammalian synapsid. It is found only at Kleinfontein, Graaff-Reinet (Cistecephalus Assemblage Zone).

See also

 List of therapsids

References

External links
 The main groups of non-mammalian synapsids at Mikko's Phylogeny Archive

Dicynodonts
Prehistoric synapsids of Africa
Permian synapsids
Fossil taxa described in 1949